Azeem Ameen Akhtar (born 8 December 1991) is an Indian first-class cricketer who plays for Rajasthan. He made his first-class debut for Rajasthan in the 2013-14 Ranji Trophy on 30 December 2013.

References

External links
 

1991 births
Living people
Indian cricketers
Rajasthan cricketers